Cedar Grove is a historic home located at Williamsport in Washington County, Maryland, United States. It is a two-story, four-bay brick-cased log dwelling with a central chimney built of stone and brick.  The original part of the house was built about 1760, with later Federal-style additions.  The house is likely one of the early tenement houses on Lord Baltimore's Conococheague Manor.

It was listed on the National Register of Historic Places in 1999.

References

External links
, including photo in 1998, at Maryland Historical Trust

Houses on the National Register of Historic Places in Maryland
Houses in Washington County, Maryland
Houses completed in 1760
Federal architecture in Maryland
National Register of Historic Places in Washington County, Maryland